The "E" or "Barnard's E" Nebula (officially designated as Barnard 142 and 143) is a pair of dark nebula in the Aquila constellation.  It is a well-defined dark area on a background of Milky Way consisting of countless stars of all magnitudes.  Its size is about that of the full moon, or roughly 0.5 degrees, and its distance from earth is estimated at 2,000 light years.

External links

 Barnard's Catalog

 B143 Hires LRGB CCD Image

Dark nebulae
Barnard objects
Aquila (constellation)